Screamer 4x4 is a 4x4 off-road game, developed by Hungarian-based Clever's Games and published by Virgin Interactive. It is the fourth and last game in the Screamer series. It is the first game in the series not developed by Milestone. It makes use of graphics hardware acceleration, allowing to choose between Glide, Direct3D and OpenGL renderers.

In North America, the game was part of a $20 budget range from Titus Interactive which was branded using the Virgin Interactive name alongside Original War, Codename: Outbreak and Nightstone.

Reception 

Screamer 4x4 garnered generally positive reviews, and holds averages of 74% and 77/100 on aggregate websites GameRankings and Metacritic.

See also 
 Sim racing
 Off-roading trials

References

External links

2000 video games
Off-road racing video games
Racing simulators
Titus Software games
Video games developed in Hungary
Virgin Interactive games
Windows games
Windows-only games
Multiplayer and single-player video games